MacDraft is a 2-D computer-aided design (CAD) program for Mac OS X, which can be used to create drafts, illustrations and architectural plans.  Unlike pixel-based drawing programs like MacPaint, MacDraft is object-based.

MacDraft was first released in 1984 by Innovative Data design.  A later version was called Dreams, but this nomenclature did not last long. The MacDraft program was later acquired by Microspot, an English software company, and its latest version is called MacDraft Professional. Microspot also releases a Windows version called PC Draft.

References

External links
MacDraft official website

1984 software
Computer-aided design software